Kardar is a surname and a Punjabi Arain clan of mainly Pakistan, Iran and Afghanistan.

People
People with the surname Kardar:
A. J. Kardar (1926–2002), Pakistani film director, producer and screenwriter
Abdul Hafeez Kardar (1925-1996), Pakistani international cricketer
Abdur Rashid Kardar (1904–1989), Pakistani and Indian film director 
Mehran Kardar, Iranian-American physicist

See also
 Kardar (disambiguation)

References

External links

Punjabi tribes
Arain
Punjabi-language surnames
Pakistani names
Social groups of Punjab, Pakistan
Social groups of Sindh